This is an overview of the progression of the world track cycling record of the men's 1 km time trial as recognised by the Union Cycliste Internationale.

Progression

Professionals (1949–1989)

Amateurs (1949–1989)

Open (from 1986)

References

Track cycling world record progressions